Pomaderris vellea, commonly known as woolly pomaderris, is a species of flowering plant in the family Rhamnaceae and is endemic to eastern Australia. It is an erect shrub with curly-hairy stems, oblong to circular leaves, and dense panicles of yellow flowers.

Description
The upper surface of the leaves is densely hairy and velvety, the lower surface covered with woolly, rust-coloured hairs. The flowers are borne in dense panicles at the ends of branches, each flower yellow, the sepals and petals together .

Taxonomy
Pomaderris vellea was first formally described in 1951 by Norman Wakefield in The Victorian Naturalist based on plant material collected from Torrington in New South Wales by J.L. Boorman in 1911. The specific epithet (vellea) means "fleece" or "wool", referring to the fine, soft texture of the leaves.

Distribution and habitat
Woolly pomaderris grows in open forest on the coast and escarpments from far south-eastern Queensland to the Sydney region and inland as far as Denman in New South Wales.

References

vellea
Flora of New South Wales
Flora of Queensland
Plants described in 1951
Taxa named by Norman Arthur Wakefield